De Dietrich Remeha is one of Europe's biggest manufacturers and distributors of domestic and commercial water and space heating systems. Headquartered in Apeldoorn in the Netherlands, it was founded in July 2004 after a merger between the Dutch firm Remeha, and the French firm De Dietrich Thermique. In July 2009, the heavily laden with debt British Baxi group agreed to merge with De Dietrich Remeha, creating the BDR Thermea Group.

Brands
De Dietrich Thermique: founded in 1684, based in Mertzwiller, France, it is France's largest manufacturer of heating systems. De Dietrich products are distributed and marketed in more than 60 countries.
Remeha: founded in 1935, Remeha is Holland's largest manufacturer of heating products, with European scale products in condensing technology. Remeha has its own subsidiaries in the United Kingdom and Germany
Oertli: founded in 1929 in Switzerland, the company is now headquartered in Thann, Haut-Rhin, France. The company produces comfort solutions such as heating boilers, burners, hot water tanks and solar systems. Oertli focuses on clean combustion (low  and  emissions), energy saving technology and a high level of product usability
Sofath: founded in the 1970s, the DFM Group based in Portes-les-Valence, France trades under its major brand of Sofath. A pioneer of geothermal heat pumps in France, the group is now the largest manufacturer of heat pumps in Europe. The DFM group turns over of €32 million and employs 110 people.

See also
Baxi
Worcester Bosch Group

References

External links
 Group website 

Manufacturing companies of the Netherlands
Apeldoorn
Heating, ventilation, and air conditioning companies
Home appliance brands
Dutch brands
Manufacturing companies established in 2004